Reanna Solomon (16 December 1981 – 1 July 2022) was a Nauruan weightlifter. She was the first female Nauruan athlete to win a Commonwealth Games gold medal, and remains one of the only three Nauruans ever to have won a Commonwealth Games gold, the others being Marcus Stephen and Yukio Peter.

Solomon competed in the 2002 Commonwealth Games. She lifted 127.5 kg in the Women's 75 kg+ Clean and Jerk, winning the gold medal, and won another gold medal by lifting 227.5 kg in the Women's 75 kg+ Combined. In the Women's 75 kg+ Snatch she took the bronze, lifting 100 kg.

Solomon also took part in the 2004 Summer Olympic Games.

Solomon died from COVID-19 on 1 July 2022, at the age of 40. The Oceania Weightlifting Federation released a statement in tribute to her. Her death was the first in Nauru to be caused by COVID-19. President of Nauru Lionel Aingimea offered condolences to her family. In August 2022, 2022 Commonwealth Games bronze medalist Maximina Uepa dedicated her medal to Solomon.

References

External links
 

1981 births
2022 deaths
Nauruan female weightlifters
Olympic weightlifters of Nauru
Weightlifters at the 2004 Summer Olympics
Commonwealth Games gold medallists for Nauru
Commonwealth Games bronze medallists for Nauru
Weightlifters at the 2002 Commonwealth Games
Commonwealth Games medallists in weightlifting
People from Meneng District
Deaths from the COVID-19 pandemic in Nauru
Medallists at the 2002 Commonwealth Games